Skënder Sallaku (25 January 1935 – 11 February 2014) was an Albanian comedian and actor, recipient of the People's Artist of Albania award. He was also a notable national champion of Albania in Greco-Roman wrestling. His filmography includes Estrada në ekran (1968), Cirku në fshat (1977),  Gjuetia e fundit (1992) and Revolja e humbur (1995).
Sallaku died in Tirana with family at his side in the morning of 11 February 2014.

References

Sources

Albanian artists
1935 births
2014 deaths
People from Tirana
People's Artists of Albania
Albanian male sport wrestlers
20th-century Albanian male actors
21st-century Albanian male actors
Sportspeople from Tirana